was a Japanese professional sumo wrestler. He was the sport's 28th yokozuna.

Career
He was born  in Ama District, Aichi Prefecture, in what is now Yatomi City. There are several conflicting sources as to his specific birth date in 1883, and he later changed his surname to 

He started sumo in Kyoto in 1898, later moving to Osaka. He entered the top makuuchi division in February 1906. He was promoted to ōzeki in June 1910. In April 1918 he became the 28th yokozuna (the third in Osaka sumo). The reason for his promotion to yokozuna was cited as being because of his great dignity. He fought in eight tournaments as yokozuna, retiring after the January 1922 basho.

After retirement he ran a tea house in Osaka.

Some of his memorabilia is on display in a museum in Yatomi City.

Osaka sumo top division record 
Osaka sumo existed independently for many years before merging with Tokyo sumo in 1926. 1–2 tournaments were held yearly, though the actual time they were held was often erratic.
 

    
    
  
 
    
    
  

    
    
  

    
    
  

    
    
  

    
    
  

    
    
  

    
    
  

    
    
  

    
    
  

    
    
  

    
    
  

    
    
  

    
    
  

    
    
  

    
    
  

    
    
  

*Championships for the best record in a tournament were not recognised or awarded in Osaka sumo before its merger with Tokyo sumo, and the unofficial championships above are historically conferred. For more information, see yūshō.

References

See also

Glossary of sumo terms
List of past sumo wrestlers
List of sumo tournament top division champions
List of yokozuna

1883 births
1943 deaths
Japanese sumo wrestlers
Yokozuna
Sumo people from Aichi Prefecture
Place of death missing
Date of birth unknown